"Lately" is a song by Skunk Anansie, released as the third single from their album Post Orgasmic Chill. It was released in August 1999. CD1 came with an interactive element featuring the video and CD2 featured three exclusive Polaroid pictures of the band. As of 2012, it is the band's last major hit, charting at #33 in their native United Kingdom.

Music video
The surreal music video was directed by Howard Greenhalgh, who directed the music video for "Goodbye" by Spice Girls, a year earlier. The music video shows the band performing in a small town where all its inhabitants are smiling while a comet (played by Skin) begins to have a collision course with Earth. The video for the single was a homage to Soundgarden's music video for "Black Hole Sun", which was also directed by Greenhalgh in 1994.

Track listing

CD single - CD1

CD single - CD2

Notes

1999 singles
Skunk Anansie songs
1999 songs
Virgin Records singles
Songs written by Skin (musician)
Songs written by Len Arran
Music videos directed by Howard Greenhalgh